The voiced alveolar fricatives are consonantal sounds. The symbol in the International Phonetic Alphabet that represents these sounds depends on whether a sibilant or non-sibilant fricative is being described.
The IPA letter  is not normally used for dental or postalveolar sibilants in narrow transcription unless modified by a diacritic ( and  respectively).

Voiced alveolar sibilant

The voiced alveolar sibilant is common across European languages, but is relatively uncommon cross-linguistically compared to the voiceless variant. Only about 28% of the world's languages contain a voiced dental or alveolar sibilant.

Features

There are at least three specific variants of :
 Dentalized laminal alveolar (commonly called "dental"), which means it is articulated with the tongue blade very close to the upper front teeth, with the tongue tip resting behind lower front teeth.
 Non-retracted alveolar, which means it is articulated with either the tip or the blade of the tongue at the alveolar ridge, termed respectively apical and laminal. According to  about half of English speakers use a non-retracted apical articulation.
 Retracted alveolar, which means it is articulated with either the tip or the blade of the tongue slightly behind the alveolar ridge, termed respectively apical and laminal.

Occurrence

Dentalized laminal alveolar

Non-retracted alveolar

Retracted alveolar

Variable

Voiced alveolar non-sibilant fricative

The voiced alveolar non-sibilant fricative  is a consonantal sound.

Few languages also have the voiced alveolar tapped fricative, which is simply a very brief apical alveolar non-sibilant fricative, with the tongue making the gesture for a tapped stop but not making full contact. It can be indicated in the IPA with the lowering diacritic to show that full occlusion does not occur. Flapped fricatives are theoretically possible but are not attested.

Features
 However, it does not have the grooved tongue and directed airflow, or the high frequencies, of a sibilant.

Occurrence

See also
 Tongue shape
 Apical consonant
 Laminal consonant
 Index of phonetics articles

Notes

References

External links
 
 
 

Alveolar consonants
Fricative consonants
Central consonants
Voiced oral consonants
Pulmonic consonants